The Pasquatchai River is a river in the Hudson Bay drainage basin in Kenora District, Northwestern Ontario, and census Division No. 23, Northern Region, Manitoba, Canada.

Course
With the exception of the final  to its mouth at the Echoing River, the Pasquatchai River lies entirely in Ontario.

See also
List of rivers of Manitoba
List of rivers of Ontario

References

 Shows the river course.

Rivers of Northern Manitoba
Rivers of Kenora District
Tributaries of Hudson Bay